A display window, also a shop window (British English) or store window (American English), is a window in a shop displaying items for sale or otherwise designed to attract customers to the store. Usually, the term refers to larger windows in the front façade of the shop.

History
The first display windows in shops were installed in the late 18th century in London, where levels of conspicuous consumption were growing rapidly. Retailer Francis Place was one of the first to experiment with this new retailing method at his tailoring establishment in Charing Cross, where he fitted the shop-front with large plate glass windows. Although this was condemned by many, he defended his practice in his memoirs, claiming that he "sold from the window more goods...than paid journeymen's wages and the expenses of housekeeping.
Display windows at boutiques usually have dressed-up mannequins in them.

Window dressing
Displaying merchandise in a store window is known as window dressing, which is also used to describe the items displayed themselves. A retail worker that arranges displays of goods is known as a window dresser.

As a figure of speech, window dressing means something done to make a better impression, and sometimes implies something dishonest or deceptive.

References

Advertising tools
Advertising techniques
Fashion terminology
Windows